Manasu may refer to :

Films

 Guppeddu Manasu, a 1979 Telugu film directed by K. Balachander.
 Manasu, a 2000 Tamil film directed by Abdul Rahman.
 Manasu Maata Vinadhu, a 2005 Telugu film directed by V.N. Aditya.
 Manasu Palike Mouna Raagam, a 2006 Telugu film starring Sneha and Vikramaditya.
 Manasu Rendum Pudhusu, a 1994 Tamil film starring Jayaram and Kushboo.
 Manchi Manasulu, a 1962 Telugu film directed by Adurthi Subba Rao.
 Manchi Manasuku Manchi Rojulu, a 1958 Telugu film directed by C. S. Rao.
 Moggina Manasu, a 2008 Kannada film directed by Shashank.
 Mooga Manasulu, a 1963 Telugu film directed by Adurthi Subba Rao.
 Tene Manasulu, a 1965 Telugu film starring Krishna.
 Thaai Manasu, a 1994 Tamil film directed by Kasthuri Raja.

Places

 Mañasu (Bolivia), a mountain in Bolivia